Degalahal is a village in Chippagiri Mandal, located in Kurnool district of Indian state of Andhra Pradesh.

References

Villages in Kurnool district